St. Luke's Hospital is a general hospital serving West St. Louis County.
St. Luke's Hospital is a 493 bed hospital with more than twenty-seven locations in the St. Louis area. St. Luke's has centers for brain, spine, cancer, pulmunory, maternity care and orthopedics, along with sixty other specialties.

St. Luke's was ranked the seventh best hospital in Missouri and the fourth best in the St. Louis Area in 2018.

History
St. Luke's Hospital was founded in February 1866 as a 25 bed infirmary in St. Louis County. In 2018, St. Luke's entered into an agreement to purchase the nearby Des Peres Hospital. As of 2018, the hospital is affiliated with Cleveland Clinic's Heart and Vascular Institute.

References

Hospitals in St. Louis
Hospitals in Missouri
1866 establishments in Missouri
Buildings and structures in St. Louis County, Missouri